Gordan Bunoza (born 5 February 1988) is a Bosnian-Herzegovinian professional footballer who plays as a centre-back.

Club career
On 2 July 2010, Wisła Kraków signed him from Karlovac for an undisclosed fee. On 19 March 2011, Wisła Kraków announced that Bunoza will be out for the rest of the 2010–11 season due to an injury he suffered during the training.

International career
After several good performances for the U-21 side, the coach of the Bosnia-Herzegovina senior team, Safet Sušić, included Bunoza in the squad to face Luxembourg and France in early September 2010.

Statistics
 (correct as of 20 July 2020)

Honours

Club
Wisła Kraków
Ekstraklasa: 2010–11

References

External links
 Profile at goal.sportal.com.au

1988 births
Living people
People from Ljubuški
Croats of Bosnia and Herzegovina
Association football fullbacks
Bosnia and Herzegovina footballers
Bosnia and Herzegovina youth international footballers
Bosnia and Herzegovina under-21 international footballers
NK Hrvatski Dragovoljac players
NK Karlovac players
Wisła Kraków players
Delfino Pescara 1936 players
FC Dinamo București players
CS Pandurii Târgu Jiu players
Incheon United FC players
AEL Limassol players
Arka Gdynia players
Croatian Football League players
Ekstraklasa players
Serie B players
Liga I players
K League 1 players
I liga players
Cypriot First Division players
Bosnia and Herzegovina expatriate footballers
Expatriate footballers in Austria
Bosnia and Herzegovina expatriate sportspeople in Austria
Expatriate footballers in Poland
Bosnia and Herzegovina expatriate sportspeople in Poland
Expatriate footballers in Italy
Bosnia and Herzegovina expatriate sportspeople in Italy
Expatriate footballers in Romania
Bosnia and Herzegovina expatriate sportspeople in Romania
Expatriate footballers in South Korea
Bosnia and Herzegovina expatriate sportspeople in South Korea
Expatriate footballers in Cyprus
Bosnia and Herzegovina expatriate sportspeople in Cyprus